Gortatowice  is a village in the administrative district of Gmina Cielądz, within Rawa County, Łódź Voivodeship, in central Poland.

References

Gortatowice
Piotrków Governorate
Łódź Voivodeship (1919–1939)